Bithynia is a genus of small freshwater snails with an operculum, aquatic prosobranch gastropod mollusks in the family Bithyniidae.

The diploid chromosome number of Bithynia sp. from Egypt is 2n=32.

Distribution
Lake Skadar with 5 species of Bithynia is a biodiversity hotspot of Bithynia evolution.

Species
Glöer (2002) recognized four subgenera Bithynia, Codiella, Neumayria and Parafossarulus within European species. He reassigned two European extinct species of Parafossarulus into a subgenus of the genus Bithynia, but the genus Parafossarulus is generally accepted for the Asian species. The subgenus Digoniostoma is also recognized for Asian species.

Subgenera and species within the genus Bithynia include:

Subgenus Bithynia Leach, 1818
Bithynia tentaculata (Linnaeus, 1758) - Common (or mud) bithynia - type species

Subgenus Codiella Locard, 1894
 Bithynia leachii (Sheppard, 1823)
 Bithynia transsilvanica (Bielz, 1853) - synonym: Bithynia troschelii (Paasch 1842)

Subgenus Neumayria De Stefani, 1887
 † Bithynia bavelensis Meijer, 1990

Subgenus Digoniostoma Annandale, 1920
 Bithynia funiculata Walker, 1927
 Bithynia siamensis Lea, 1856

Subgenus Incertae sedis
 Bithynia phialensis (Conrad, 1852)
 Bithynia pseudemmericia Schütt, 1964

Subgenus ?

 † Bithynia almerai Almera, 1894 
 † Bithynia berthelini Depéret, 1894 
 Bithynia boissieri (Küster, 1852)
  † Bithynia brusinai Halaváts, 1903
 † Bithynia budinici Brusina, 1902 
 Bithynia candiota Westerlund, 1886
 Bithynia canyamelensis Altaba, 2007
 Bithynia cerameopoma (Benson, 1830)
 Bithynia cettinensis Clessin, 1887
 † Bithynia clessini Brusina, 1884 
 Bithynia cretensis Glöer & Maassen, 2009
 † Bithynia croatica Pilar, 1874 
 † Bithynia cyclostoma (Rousseau, 1842) 
 Bithynia danubialis Glöer & Georgiev, 2012
 † Bithynia dunkeri Gude, 1913 
 † Bithynia erzuruma Schütt, 1991 
 Bithynia forcarti Glöer & Pešić, 2012
 † Bithynia fuchsi Willmann, 1981 
 Bithynia fuchsiana (Möllendorff, 1888)
 Bithynia ghodaghodiensis Glöer & Bössneck, 2013
 † Bithynia giralanensis Oppenheim, 1919 
 † Bithynia glabra (von Zieten, 1832) 
 Bithynia graeca Westerlund, 1879
 Bithynia hambergerae A. Reischütz, N. Reischütz & P. L. Reischütz, 2008
 Bithynia italica (Paulucci, 1879)
 † Bithynia jurinaci Brusina, 1884 
 Bithynia kobialkai Glöer & Beckmann, 2007
 † Bithynia leberonensis Fischer & Tournouër, 1873 
 Bithynia lithoglyphoides (Nesemann & G. Sharma, 2007)
 Bithynia longicornis Benson - in China
 Bithynia majorcina Glöer & Rolán, 2007   
 Bithynia manonellesi Altaba, 2007
 † Bithynia marasinica Andrusov, 1909 
 Bithynia mazandaranensis Glöer & Pešić, 2012
 † Bithynia mediocris Ludwig, 1865
 † Bithynia minor Locard, 1878  
 Bithynia misella (Gredler, 1884)
 Bithynia montenegrina Wohlberedt, 1901
 Bithynia mostarensis Möllendorff, 1873
 † Bithynia multicostata Tchernov, 1975 
 Bithynia nakeae Glöer & Beckmann, 2007
 Bithynia numidica Bourguignat, 1864
 Bithynia orcula Frauenfeld, 1862
 Bithynia pauli Altaba, 2007
 Bithynia pesicii Glöer & Yildirim, 2006
 Bithynia phialensis (Conrad, 1852)
 † Bithynia phrygica (Fischer in Tchihatcheff, 1866)
 † Bithynia pilari Neumayr in Neumayr & Paul, 1875 
 † Bithynia pisidica Oppenheim, 1919 
 † Bithynia podarensis (Pană in Pană et al., 1981) 
 † Bithynia pontica Gozhik, 2002 
 Bithynia prespensis Hadžišče, 1963
 Bithynia prestoni Glöer & Bössneck, 2013
 † Bithynia protemmericia Willmann, 1981 
 Bithynia pseudemmericia Schütt, 1964
 Bithynia pulchella (Benson, 1836)
 Bithynia quintanai Glöer & Beckmann, 2007
 Bithynia radomani Glöer & Pešić, 2007
 Bithynia raptiensis Glöer & Bössneck, 2013
 Bithynia reharensis Glöer & Bössneck, 2013
 Bithynia riddifordi Altaba, 2007
 † Bithynia rubella Schütt in Schütt & Besenecker, 1973 
 Bithynia rubens (Menke, 1830)
 † Bithynia rumana Porumbaru, 1881 
 † Bithynia sabbae Gozhik, 2002 
 † Bithynia schuetti Schlickum & Strauch, 1974 
 Bithynia schwabii Frauenfeld, 1865
 † Bithynia sermenazensis Depéret, 1894 
 Bithynia shapkarevi Glöer, Shoreva & Slavevska-Stamenković, 2015
 Bithynia sibirica Westerlund, 1886
 Bithynia sistanica (Annandale & Prashad, 1919)
 Bithynia skadarskii Glöer & Pešić, 2007
 Bithynia starmuehlneri Glöer & Pešić, 2012
 Bithynia stenothyroides (Dohrn, 1857)
 Bithynia subbaraoi Glöer & Bössneck, 2013
 Bithynia timmii Odabaşı & Arslan, 2015
 Bithynia transsilvanica Bielz, 1853
 † Bithynia ungeri (Rolle, 1860) 
 † Bithynia veneria Fontannes, 1881 
 † Bithynia verneuili (Mayer, 1856) 
 † Bithynia verrii de Stefani, 1880 
 Bithynia vukotinovici Brusina, 1874 †
 Bithynia walderdorffii Frauenfeld, 1865
 Bithynia walkeri (Brandt, 1968)
 Bithynia yildirimi Glöer & Georgiev, 2012
 Bithynia zeta Glöer & Pešić, 2007
 † Bithynia zoranici Brusina, 1902 

Synonyms:
 Bithynia badiella (Küster, 1852): synonym of Pseudobithynia badiella (Küster, 1853)
 † Bithynia bengestensis Fontannes, 1887: synonym of  † Tylopoma bengestiensis (Fontannes, 1887) 
 † Bithynia brusinai Halaváts, 1903: synonym of  † Lithoglyphus acutus decipiens Brusina, 1885 
 † Bithynia crassitesta (Brömme, 1883): synonym of  † Parafossarulus crassitesta (Brömme, 1883) 
 † Bithynia curta Locard, 1893: synonym of  † Bithynia glabra helvetica (Wenz, 1930) 
 † Bithynia gracilis Sandberger, 1875: synonym of  † Bithynia glabra glabra (von Zieten, 1832) 
 Bithynia hamicensis Pallary, 1939: synonym of Pseudobithynia hamicensis (Pallary, 1939)
 † Bithynia labiata Neumayr in Herbich & Neumayr, 1875: synonym of  † Neumayria labiata (Neumayr in Herbich & Neumayr, 1875) 
 Bithynia leachi (Sheppard, 1823): synonym of Bithynia leachii (Sheppard, 1823)
 Bithynia majewsky Frauenfeld, 1862: synonym of Bithynia tentaculata (Linnaeus, 1758)
 † Bithynia margaritula Fuchs, 1870: synonym of † Pseudamnicola (Pseudamnicola) margaritula (Fuchs, 1870) 
  Bithynia narentana Locard, 1874 : synonym of Bithynia mostarensis Möllendorff, 1873
 Bithynia pentheri Sturany, 1904: synonym of Pseudobithynia pentheri (Sturany, 1904)
 Bithynia phaeacina Locard, 1887: synonym of Pseudobithynia renei (Letourneux, 1887)
 † Bithynia podwinensis Neumayr in Neumayr & Paul, 1875: synonym of  † Neumayria podwinensis (Neumayr in Neumayr & Paul, 1875) 
 † Bithynia proxima Fuchs, 1870: synonym of † Pseudamnicola proxima (Fuchs, 1870) 
 Bithynia saulcyi Bourguignat, 1853: synonym of Pseudobithynia saulcyi (Bourguignat, 1853)
 † Bithynia scalaris Fuchs, 1877: synonym of  † Bythinella megarensis Bukowski, 1896 
 † Bithynia spoliata Stefanescu, 1896: synonym of  † Neumayria spoliata (Stefanescu, 1896) 
 Bithynia stossichiana Locard, 1894: synonym of Pseudobithynia renei (Letourneux, 1887)
 Bithynia uzielliana Issel, 1866: synonym of Gangetia uzielliana (Issel, 1866)
 † Bithynia vucotinovici Brusina, 1874: synonym of  † Neumayria vukotinovici (Brusina, 1874) 
 † Bithynia vukotinovici Brusina, 1874: synonym of  † Neumayria vukotinovici (Brusina, 1874)

See also 
 Parafossarulus

References

  Glöer P. & Pešić V. (2012) The freshwater snails (Gastropoda) of Iran, with descriptions of two new genera and eight new species. ZooKeys 219: 11–61

External links 

 Glöer P. & Pešić V. (2007). "The Bithynia species from Skadar Lake (Montenegro) (Gastropoda: Bithyniidae)". Mollusca 25(1): 7-12. Dresden.

Bithyniidae
Gastropod genera
Taxa named by William Elford Leach